UPF may refer to:

Organisations
Union internationale de la presse francophone, an association of Francophone journalists
Uganda Police Force, the national police force of Uganda
Universal Peace Federation, an organization of the Unification Church

Education
Universidad Paulo Freire, a university in Nicaragua
Universidade de Passo Fundo, a university in Brazil
Universitat Pompeu Fabra, a university in Spain
Université de la Polynésie Française, a university in Tahiti
University Press of Florida, a scholarly press

Politics
Unified Popular Front, a political party in Iraq
Union populaire française, a breakaway section of the French Communist Party, 1939
Union pour la France, an electoral coalition in France, 1992–1997
United Patriots Front, Australian street protest movement
United People's Front of Nepal, a political organization
United Popular Front, a Greek political party
Up-Country People's Front, a political party in Sri Lanka
Upsurging People's Force, a militant group in Sri Lanka

Sport
Universal Peace Foundation, a Palauan association football club

Places
Upper Palatine Forest, a natural region in Germany
Ust’ Pinega Formation, a geological formation in Russia

Other uses
Ultraviolet Protection Factor, a rating for sun protective clothing
Ultra-processed food
Unified Power Format, a file format for electronic power intent
Utah Pride Festival, an LGBT festival in Salt Lake City, Utah
UPF-Centre for Animal Ethics, an animal advocacy think tank based at Pompeu Fabra University

See also
ÜPF